Les Gorges d'Apremont are located several kilometers from Fontainebleau. Les Gorges d'Apremont is a bouldering  i.e.(rock climbing) area with several hundred boulders of all difficulty levels (Font Scale F4-F8a).

See also
 Fontainebleau rock climbing

Climbing areas of France
Geography of Seine-et-Marne
Tourist attractions in Île-de-France
Tourist attractions in Seine-et-Marne